Calliasmata is a genus of shrimp in the family Hippolytidae, containing the following species:
Calliasmata nohochi Escobar-Briones et al., 1997
Calliasmata pholidota Holthuis, 1973
Calliasmata rimolii Chace, 1975

References

Alpheoidea